"Pumpkin Patch" is the fifth episode of the horror black comedy series Scream Queens. It first aired on October 13, 2015 on Fox. The episode was both directed and written by Brad Falchuk. In this episode, Dean Munsch (Jamie Lee Curtis) makes an announcement that affects the campus, and mostly, Chanel (Emma Roberts)'s plan to throw a pumpkin patch party in support of her Kappa presidential campaign. Grace (Skyler Samuels) and Pete (Diego Boneta) lead a search for Zayday (Keke Palmer), who was kidnapped by the Red Devil.

The episode was watched by 2.97 million viewers and received mixed to positive reviews from critics.

Plot

The Chanels are organizing the pumpkin patch with Chanel (Emma Roberts) demanding the party organizer, Cliff Woo (Roy Huang), an exact maze replica from The Shining. Later, in the closet, Chanel assigns costumes of dead first ladies for her and her minions to wear. Chanel #5 (Abigail Breslin) gets annoyed when Chanel force her to dress up as Mary Todd Lincoln and starts a little fight with Chanel, which ends with Chanel #5 walking out of the room. In the night, Dean Munsch (Jamie Lee Curtis) announces she's closing the university campus and institutes a curfew on Halloween night, automatically cancelling Chanel's pumpkin patch party. Chanel decides to break the rules and changes her party to November 1. Hester / Chanel #6 (Lea Michele), who previously called Chanel #5 a bitch during the previous argument between #5 and Chanel, convinces her to destroy Chanel. Both of them go to Jennifer "The Candle Vlogger" (Breezy Eslin)'s room to recruit her in their plan by showing her a closet with unused candles that Chanel threw away.

In class, Chanel is openly cheating on a test by bringing an Asian guy who isn't enrolled in the campus when the teacher scolds her. When she calls her dad to get the teacher fired, after scolding her, Detective Chisolm (Jim Clock) walks in and tells her she's under arrest for the murder of Ms. Bean (Jan Hoag). Chanel is then seen handcuffed and put into a police car with the Chanels and Jennifer watching as she is taken away. In prison, Chanel is seen talking with three female prisoners, one of them who is a fan of Chanel, says she loved the severed hand she got for Chanel-o-ween the previous year, a police officer tells her that her bail has been paid. It's revealed that Chanel #3 (Billie Lourd) and Sam "Predatory Lesbian" (Jeanna Han) bailed her out. Chanel returns and is outraged to see #5 wearing Chanel's Halloween costume, Jackie Kennedy. Chanel reveals that Hester and Jennifer told her everything, that #5 was the one who told the police about what Chanel did to Ms. Bean. #5 says Hester is trying to frame her. Chanel doesn't believe her, and as punishment, she forces #5 to light all of the Jack-o'-lanterns in the pumpkin patch on Halloween night, since she knows that the Red Devil will be out there, or else Chanel would have shown #5's two twin boyfriends, Roger (Aaron Rhodes) and Dodger (Austin Rhodes) a video of her masturbating to Dora the Explorer. With no choice, she lights all the pumpkins with her boyfriends. The Red Devil appears with hedge shears behind #5 when she's lighting a pumpkin, and all of them run into the maze. Before anything, the twins ask her to pick one of them as a boyfriend, she picks Roger. Dodger ends up getting killed as Roger and #5 manage to get out and escape.

Zayday (Keke Palmer) is revealed to be held hostage in a hole under the Red Devil's lair. Grace (Skyler Samuels), Pete (Diego Boneta), Wes (Oliver Hudson), Gigi (Nasim Pedrad), and Denise (Niecy Nash), the latter of whom has been hired by Munsch to find Zayday, start to search for her. They find The Red Devil's secret lair, where the Red Devil turns the power off leaving them in total darkness. Gigi, however, manages to taser The Red Devil, when the power turns back on, Denise runs to the others to tell them. But when they find Gigi, she says the Red Devil got up and hit her in the head with a baseball bat and escaped down a laundry chute. Thinking that Gigi did such a brave thing to save them, Grace finally accepts that Gigi is the one who stole Wes' heart since her mother died, as previously she thought Gigi was insane when she discovered that her father and Gigi started a relationship. Back at Kappa house, Chanel tries to call the presidential election early due to Zayday and Grace's absences. However, Zayday appears and tells them what happened. The Red Devil let her out of the hole, gave her roses and presented her with her favorite food before she stabbed the Red Devil in the hand with a fork and escaped. Grace then returns and is happy to see Zayday. They then all get ready to vote. Later that night, Gigi meets with the Red Devil, and in limited words, she reprimands him for the sloppiness of the Zayday incident, and telling him to murder an unknown male, revealing that she is the mastermind behind the Red Devil's murder spree.

Production
At the day the series premiered on Fox, series creator Ryan Murphy revealed that there would be a three-part Halloween episodes. This is the second Halloween episode. Special guest star Niecy Nash returns as Denise Hemphill, the odd security guard. Returning recurring characters including Kappa pledges Jennifer "Candle Vlogger" (Breezy Eslin) and Sam "Predatory Lez" (Jeanna Han), Detective Chisolm (Jim Clock), and Dickie Dollar Scholars fraternity members Caulfield (Evan Paley), and twins Roger (Aaron Rhodes) and Dodger (Austin Rhodes).

Back on September 2, 2015, Entertainment Weekly exclusively released an opening credits sequence for Scream Queens. Murphy also released the video on his YouTube channel. It features all the main cast members names, with Roberts, Skyler Samuels, Lea Michele, Glen Powell, Diego Boneta, Abigail Breslin, Keke Palmer, and Billie Lourd, along with the series' main villain, the Red Devil, appearing in the video. It features them screaming and attacked by the Red Devil in a homage to 80s horror flicks. An original song, "You Belong To Me" is performed by singer Heather Heywood, which was written by show composer Mac Quayle, Heywood and executive producer Alexis Martin Woodall. The title sequence has so far only appeared in this episode, though it is trimmed down to under a minute due to time constraints.

Reception

Ratings
Pumpkin Patch was watched live by 2.39 million U.S and got a 1.0/3 rating/share in the adult 18-49 demographic

Critical reception
Pumpkin Patch received generally positive reviews from critics. IGN's Amber Dowling gave the episode 9.0 out of 10, saying "The second Halloween installment of Scream Queens wasn’t as spooky or gruesome as last week’s “Haunted House,” but it served to move the plot along via Chanel’s arrest and Gigi’s big reveal."
Genevieve Valentine from The A.V. Club gave the episode a C+ and cited "The show cribs from the best; in this episode, it spends quite a bit of time on The Shining and Silence of the Lambs. But both of those became iconic because of their careful craftsmanship and deliberate pacing, neither of which carries over The episode’s big reveal—that Gigi is in league with the Red Devil—means nothing. I expect; Scream Queens isn’t interested in creating a horror story if it can manufacture some water-cooler camp instead."

References

2015 American television episodes
Scream Queens (2015 TV series) episodes
Television episodes written by Brad Falchuk